Sarfaraz Ali (born 20 October 1981) is a cricketer who plays for the Bahrain national cricket team and currently captains the national team in Twenty20 Internationals.

Career 
Ali debuted internationally for the Bahraini cricket team on 20 January 2019, against Saudi Arabia in the opening game of the 2019 ACC Western Region T20, in which he was awarded man-of-the-match for his performance. He went on to score 141 runs at an average of 35.25 throughout the tournament and took no additional wickets. 

He was then selected to play in the 2020 ACC Western Region T20, in which Ali scored 112 runs and took 2 wickets throughout the tournament. He led the team to the semi-finals of the tournament, but lost to Kuwait in a crushing 87-run loss. 

Ali didn't play for the rest of 2020 and the majority of 2021 due to the COVID-19 pandemic. Ali returned to cricket by playing in the 2021 ICC Men's T20 World Cup Asia Qualifier. His team came out as the champions, with Ali scoring 159 runs and taking a wicket during the tournament. He then went on to captain the team in the 2022 ICC Men's T20 World Cup Global Qualifier A, in which Bahrain placed 6th in, after being beaten by the Canadians in the 5th place play-offs. Bahrain played valiantly, eventually just nearly missing the semi-finals on net run rate to the United Arab Emirates. Ali scored 157 runs and took 3 wickets during the qualifier.

References 

1981 births
Living people
Bahraini cricketers
Bahrain Twenty20 International cricketers
Pakistani expatriate sportspeople in Bahrain